The 2011 Iowa Hawkeyes football team represented the University of Iowa in the 2011 NCAA Division I FBS football season. The Hawkeyes were led by head coach Kirk Ferentz, who was in his 13th season, and played their homes games at Kinnick Stadium in Iowa City, Iowa. They are member of the Legends Division of the Big Ten Conference. They finished the season 7–6 overall and 4–4 in Big Ten Conference play to finish in fourth place in the Legends Division. They were invited to the Insight Bowl, for the second consecutive year, where they were defeated by Oklahoma, 31–14.

Schedule

Roster

Regular season

Tennessee Tech

Source: Box Score

Honorary Captain: Brad Banks

at Iowa State

at Pittsburgh

Louisiana–Monroe

Source: Box Score

at Penn State

Source: Box Score

Northwestern

Source: Box Score

Indiana

Source: Box Score

at Minnesota

Michigan

Source: Box Score

Michigan State

at Purdue

at Nebraska

vs. Oklahoma (Insight Bowl)

Source: Box Score

Postseason Awards
Marvin McNutt - Big Ten Wide Receiver of the Year
Riley Reiff - First-team All-American (Pro Football Writers)

Players in the 2012 NFL Draft

References

Iowa
Iowa Hawkeyes football seasons
Iowa Hawkeyes football